David Hacking, 3rd Baron Hacking (born 17 April 1938), is a British arbitrator, barrister and hereditary peer.

Education and military career
He was educated at Aldro preparatory school, Charterhouse and Clare College, Cambridge, from where he graduated BA in 1961; he received his MA in 1968. His professional education was at the Inns of Court School of Law. He served in the Royal Naval Reserve from 1954 to 1964, seeing active service 1956-8 and reaching the rank of Lieutenant.

Career in law
Hacking is a qualified barrister and solicitor in England and Wales as well as an Attorney in the United States. He has worked for over 40 years as an international arbitrator and mediator of commercial disputes.

House of Lords
Having inherited the title Baron Hacking from his father in 1971, Hacking sat in the House of Lords for over 20 years, contributing to reform of arbitration law and related areas. Having sat as a Conservative, in 1998 he defected to Labour over the European and law and order policies of then party leader William Hague. He lost his automatic right to a seat under the House of Lords Act 1999. He sought to return to the House in the by-election caused by the death of Lord Milner of Leeds in 2003. He stood in several subsequent by-elections (as a crossbencher), and succeeded in 2021 as a Labour candidate to replace Viscount Simon, 47 years after he first entered the Lords in 1974. He took the oath again on Thursday, 2 December 2021, Lord Hacking made his second maiden speech on 7 February 2022, reflecting on the number of Baronesses in the Lords compared to when he left in 1999, remembering his first maiden speech which he nearly made 50 years ago, on 26 April 1972 & the amount of amendments on legalisation going through the Lords. Lord Hacking is the oldest hereditary peer to have been elected during hereditary peers by elections.

Arms

References

External links

Living people
1938 births
People educated at Aldro
People educated at Charterhouse School
Alumni of Clare College, Cambridge
3
British barristers
Conservative Party (UK) hereditary peers
Labour Party (UK) hereditary peers
Baronets in the Baronetage of the United Kingdom
Royal Naval Reserve personnel

Hacking
Hacking